Colin Grant (born 21 July 1944) is a Scottish former professional footballer who played as a forward.

Playing career
Born in Edinburgh and raised in Bo'ness, in 1963, Grant signed for Linlithgow Rose. After a season at the club, in which he scored 55 goals, Grant was signed by Jock Stein for Hibernian. On 21 February 1966, Grant made his debut for Hibs in a 2–1 defeat against rivals Heart of Midlothian in the Scottish Cup. During his time at the club, Grant scored 15 times in 41 appearances in all competitions, including once against Lokomotive Leipzig in the Inter-Cities Fairs Cup in November 1968. Following his departure from Hibs, Grant moved to England, signing for Chelmsford City. After four years at Chelmsford, Grant returned to Scotland, signing for Highland League club Peterhead.

Managerial career
In 1976, whilst still a player, Grant was appointed as Peterhead's first ever manager, after a selection committee was in charge of team affairs. Grant remained as manager until 1980. During the 1980s, whilst living in Ellon, Grant managed Ellon United.

In 2004, Grant joined Aberdeen as head of academy scouting. During his time at Aberdeen, the likes of Scott McKenna, Joe Shaughnessy and Calvin Ramsay were signed by the club. In 2014, Grant stepped down from his role at the club.

References

1944 births
Living people
Footballers from Edinburgh
Association football forwards
Scottish footballers
Scottish football managers
Association football scouts
Linlithgow Rose F.C. players
Hibernian F.C. players
Chelmsford City F.C. players
Peterhead F.C. players
Peterhead F.C. managers
Aberdeen F.C. non-playing staff
Highland Football League players
Southern Football League players
Scottish Football League players
Highland Football League managers